American rapper Eminem has released five video albums and appeared in various music videos, films, and television programs.

His first song to have an official music video was his first single "Just Don't Give a Fuck".

Video albums

Music videos

Filmography

See also
 Eminem albums discography
 Eminem singles discography
 Eminem production discography
 Bad Meets Evil discography
 D12 discography

References 

Videographies of American artists